CJVA-FM is a French language Canadian radio station broadcasting in Caraquet, New Brunswick at 94.1 MHz (FM). CJVA-FM is owned and operated by Radio Acadie, Limitée.

History
On July 18, 1973, Dr. Alphee Michaud on behalf of a company to be incorporated was awarded a licence for a new AM station at Caraquet. The station officially began broadcasting on its original frequency at 810 kHz in 1977.

In 1995, the station began receiving programs from CKLE-FM Bathurst, New Brunswick part-time.

In 2014, Radio Acadie submitted an application to convert CJVA to 94.1 MHz. This application received approval by the CRTC on February 13, 2015.

CJVA shutdown its old AM 810 transmitter on August 1, 2016. Programming would continue on CJVA-FM 94.1.

References

External links
CKLE-FM/CJVA-FM (in French)
 
 
  
 

Jva
Jva
Jva
Radio stations established in 1973
1973 establishments in New Brunswick
Caraquet